The cinema of the United States, consisting mainly of major film studios (also known metonymously as Hollywood) along with some independent films, has had a large effect on the global film industry since the early 20th century. The dominant style of American cinema is classical Hollywood cinema, which developed from 1910 to 1969 and is still typical of most films made there to this day. While Frenchmen Auguste and Louis Lumière are generally credited with the birth of modern cinema, American cinema soon came to be a dominant force in the emerging industry. , it produced the third-largest number of films of any national cinema, after India and China, with more than 600 English-language films released on average every year. While the national cinemas of the United Kingdom, Canada, Australia, and New Zealand also produce films in the same language, they are not part of the Hollywood system. Because of this, Hollywood has also been considered a transnational cinema, and has produced multiple language versions of some titles, often in Spanish or French. Contemporary Hollywood often outsources production to Canada, Australia, and New Zealand.

Hollywood is considered to be the oldest film industry, in the sense of being the place where the earliest film studios and production companies emerged. It is the birthplace of various genres of cinema—among them comedy, drama, action, the musical, romance, horror, science fiction, and the war epic—and has set the example for other national film industries.

In 1878, Eadweard Muybridge demonstrated the power of photography to capture motion. In 1894, the world's first commercial motion-picture exhibition was given in New York City, using Thomas Edison's kinetoscope. In the following decades, production of silent film greatly expanded, studios formed and migrated to California, and films and the stories they told became much longer. The United States produced the world's first sync-sound musical film, The Jazz Singer, in 1927, and was at the forefront of sound-film development in the following decades. Since the early 20th century, the U.S. film industry has primarily been based in and around the thirty-mile zone centered in the Hollywood neighborhood of Los Angeles County, California. Director D.W. Griffith was central to the development of a film grammar. Orson Welles's Citizen Kane (1941) is frequently cited in critics' polls as the greatest film of all time.

The major film studios of Hollywood are the primary source of the most commercially successful and most ticket selling movies in the world. Many of Hollywood's highest-grossing movies have generated more box-office revenue and ticket sales outside the United States than films made elsewhere. The United States is a leading pioneer in motion picture engineering and technology.

History

1894–1907: Origins and Fort Lee

The first recorded instance of photographs capturing and reproducing motion was a series of photographs of a running horse by Eadweard Muybridge, which he took in Palo Alto, California, using a set of still cameras placed in a row. Muybridge's accomplishment led inventors everywhere to attempt to make similar devices. In the United States, Thomas Edison was among the first to produce such a device, the kinetoscope.

The history of cinema in the United States can trace its roots to the East Coast where, at one time, Fort Lee, New Jersey, was the motion-picture capital of America. The industry got its start at the end of the 19th century with the construction of Thomas Edison's "Black Maria", the first motion-picture studio in West Orange, New Jersey. The cities and towns on the Hudson River and Hudson Palisades offered land at costs considerably less than New York City across the river and benefited greatly as a result of the phenomenal growth of the film industry at the turn of the 20th century.

The industry began attracting both capital and an innovative workforce. In 1907, when the Kalem Company began using Fort Lee as a location for filming in the area, other filmmakers quickly followed. In 1909, a forerunner of Universal Studios, the Champion Film Company, built the first studio. Others quickly followed and either built new studios or leased facilities in Fort Lee. In the 1910s and 1920s, film companies such as the Independent Moving Pictures Company, Peerless Studios, The Solax Company, Éclair Studios, Goldwyn Picture Corporation, American Méliès (Star Films), World Film Company, Biograph Studios, Fox Film Corporation, Pathé Frères, Metro Pictures Corporation, Victor Film Company, and Selznick Pictures Corporation were all making pictures in Fort Lee. Such notables as Mary Pickford got their start at Biograph Studios.

In New York, the Kaufman Astoria Studios in Queens, which was built during the silent film era, was used by the Marx Brothers and W.C. Fields. The Edison Studios were located in the Bronx. Chelsea, Manhattan, was also frequently used. Other Eastern cities, most notably Chicago and Cleveland, also served as early centers for film production. In the West, California was already quickly emerging as a major film production center. In Colorado, Denver was home to the Art-O-Graf film company, and Walt Disney's early Laugh-O-Gram animation studio was based in Kansas City, Missouri. Picture City, Florida, was a planned site for a movie picture production center in the 1920s, but due to the 1928 Okeechobee hurricane, the idea collapsed and Picture City returned to its original name of Hobe Sound. An attempt to establish a film production center in Detroit also proved unsuccessful.

The film patents wars of the early 20th century helped facilitate the spread of film companies to other parts of the US, outside New York. Many filmmakers worked with equipment for which they did not own the rights to use. Therefore, filming in New York could be dangerous as it was close to Edison's company headquarters, and close to the agents who the company set out to seize cameras. By 1912, most major film companies had set up production facilities in Southern California near or in Los Angeles because of the region's favorable year-round weather.

1907–1927: Rise of Hollywood

The 1908 Selig Polyscope Company production of The Count of Monte Cristo directed by Francis Boggs and starring Hobart Bosworth was claimed as the first to have been filmed in Los Angeles, in 1907, with a plaque being unveiled by the city in 1957 at Dearden's flagship store on the corner of Main Street and 7th Street, to mark the filming on the site when it had been a Chinese laundry. Bosworth's widow suggested the city had got the date and location wrong, and that the film was actually shot in nearby Venice, which at the time was an independent city. Boggs' In the Sultan's Power for Selig Polyscope, also starring Bosworth, is considered the first film shot entirely in Los Angeles, with shooting at 7th and Olive Streets in 1909.

In early 1910, director D. W. Griffith was sent by the Biograph Company to the west coast with his acting troupe, consisting of actors Blanche Sweet, Lillian Gish, Mary Pickford, Lionel Barrymore and others. They started filming on a vacant lot near Georgia Street in downtown Los Angeles. While there, the company decided to explore new territories, traveling several miles north to Hollywood, a little village that was friendly and enjoyed the movie company filming there. Griffith then filmed the first movie ever shot in Hollywood, In Old California, a Biograph melodrama about California in the 19th century, when it belonged to Mexico. Griffith stayed there for months and made several films before returning to New York. Also in 1910, Selig Polyscope of Chicago established the first film studio in the Los Angeles area in Edendale and the first studio in Hollywood opened in 1912. After hearing about Griffith's success in Hollywood, in 1913, many movie-makers headed west to avoid the fees imposed by Thomas Edison, who owned patents on the movie-making process. Nestor Studios of Bayonne, New Jersey, built the first studio in the Hollywood neighborhood in 1911. Nestor Studios, owned by David and William Horsley, later merged with Universal Studios; and William Horsley's other company, Hollywood Film Laboratory, is now the oldest existing company in Hollywood, now called the Hollywood Digital Laboratory. California's more hospitable and cost-effective climate led to the eventual shift of virtually all filmmaking to the West Coast by the 1930s. At the time, Thomas Edison owned almost all the patents relevant to motion picture production and movie producers on the East Coast acting independently of Edison's Motion Picture Patents Company were often sued or enjoined by Edison and his agents while movie makers working on the West Coast could work independently of Edison's control.

In Los Angeles, the studios and Hollywood grew. Before World War I, films were made in several American cities, but filmmakers tended to gravitate towards southern California as the industry developed. They were attracted by the warm climate and reliable sunlight, which made it possible to film their films outdoors year-round and by the varied scenery that was available. War damage contributed to the decline of the then-dominant European film industry, in favor of the United States, where infrastructure was still intact. The stronger early public health response to the 1918 flu epidemic by Los Angeles compared to other American cities reduced the number of cases there and resulted in a faster recovery, contributing to the increasing dominance of Hollywood over New York City. During the pandemic, public health officials temporarily closed movie theaters in some jurisdictions, large studios suspended production for weeks at a time, and some actors came down with the flu. This caused major financial losses and severe difficulties for small studios, but the industry as a whole more than recovered during the Roaring Twenties.

There are several starting points for cinema (particularly American cinema), but it was Griffith's controversial 1915 epic The Birth of a Nation that pioneered the worldwide filming vocabulary that still dominates celluloid to this day. 

In the early 20th century, when the medium was new, many Jewish immigrants found employment in the US film industry. They were able to make their mark in a brand-new business: the exhibition of short films in storefront theaters called nickelodeons, after their admission price of a nickel (five cents). Within a few years, ambitious men like Samuel Goldwyn, William Fox, Carl Laemmle, Adolph Zukor, Louis B. Mayer, and the Warner Brothers (Harry, Albert, Samuel, and Jack) had switched to the production side of the business. Soon they were the heads of a new kind of enterprise: the movie studio. The US had at least two female directors, producers and studio heads in these early years: Lois Weber and French-born Alice Guy-Blaché. They also set the stage for the industry's internationalism; the industry is often accused of Amerocentric provincialism.

Other moviemakers arrived from Europe after World War I: directors like Ernst Lubitsch, Alfred Hitchcock, Fritz Lang and Jean Renoir; and actors like Rudolph Valentino, Marlene Dietrich, Ronald Colman, and Charles Boyer. They joined a homegrown supply of actors—lured west from the New York City stage after the introduction of sound films—to form one of the 20th century's most remarkable growth industries. At motion pictures' height of popularity in the mid-1940s, the studios were cranking out a total of about 400 movies a year, seen by an audience of 90 million Americans per week.

Sound also became widely used in Hollywood in the late 1920s. After The Jazz Singer, the first film with synchronized voices was successfully released as a Vitaphone talkie in 1927, Hollywood film companies would respond to Warner Bros. and begin to use Vitaphone sound—which Warner Bros. owned until 1928—in future films. By May 1928, Electrical Research Product Incorporated (ERPI), a subsidiary of the Western Electric company, gained a monopoly over film sound distribution.

A side effect of the "talkies" was that many actors who had made their careers in silent films suddenly found themselves out of work, as they often had bad voices or could not remember their lines. Meanwhile, in 1922, US politician Will H. Hays left politics and formed the movie studio boss organization known as the Motion Picture Producers and Distributors of America (MPPDA). The organization became the Motion Picture Association of America after Hays retired in 1945.

In the early times of talkies, American studios found that their sound productions were rejected in foreign-language markets and even among speakers of other dialects of English. The synchronization technology was still too primitive for dubbing. One of the solutions was creating parallel foreign-language versions of Hollywood films. Around 1930, the American companies opened a studio in Joinville-le-Pont, France, where the same sets and wardrobe and even mass scenes were used for different time-sharing crews.

Also, foreign unemployed actors, playwrights, and winners of photogenia contests were chosen and brought to Hollywood, where they shot parallel versions of the English-language films. These parallel versions had a lower budget, were shot at night and were directed by second-line American directors who did not speak the foreign language. The Spanish-language crews included people like Luis Buñuel, Enrique Jardiel Poncela, Xavier Cugat, and Edgar Neville. The productions were not very successful in their intended markets, due to the following reasons:

 The lower budgets were apparent.
 Many theater actors had no previous experience in cinema.
 The original movies were often second-rate themselves since studios expected that the top productions would sell by themselves.
 The mix of foreign accents (Castilian, Mexican, and Chilean for example in the Spanish case) was odd for the audiences.
 Some markets lacked sound-equipped theaters.
In spite of this, some productions like the Spanish version of Dracula compare favorably with the original. By the mid-1930s, synchronization had advanced enough for dubbing to become usual.

1913–1969: Classical Hollywood cinema and the Golden Age of Hollywood

Classical Hollywood cinema, or the Golden Age of Hollywood, is defined as a technical and narrative style characteristic of American cinema from 1913 to 1969, during which thousands of movies were issued from the Hollywood studios. The Classical style began to emerge in 1913, was accelerated in 1917 after the U.S. entered World War I, and finally solidified when the film The Jazz Singer was released in 1927, ending the silent film era and increasing box-office profits for film industry by introducing sound to feature films.

Most Hollywood pictures adhered closely to a formula – Western, Slapstick Comedy, Musical, Animated Cartoon, Biographical Film (biographical picture) – and the same creative teams often worked on films made by the same studio. For example, Cedric Gibbons and Herbert Stothart always worked on MGM films, Alfred Newman worked at 20th Century Fox for twenty years, Cecil B. De Mille's films were almost all made at Paramount, and director Henry King's films were mostly made for 20th Century Fox.

At the same time, one could usually guess which studio made which film, largely because of the actors who appeared in it; MGM, for example, claimed it had contracted "more stars than there are in heaven." Each studio had its own style and characteristic touches which made it possible to know this – a trait that rarely exist today.

For example, To Have and Have Not (1944) is notable not only for the first pairing of actors Humphrey Bogart (1899–1957) and Lauren Bacall (1924–2014), but because it was written by two future winners of the Nobel Prize in Literature: Ernest Hemingway (1899–1961), the author of the novel on which the script was nominally based, and William Faulkner (1897–1962), who worked on the screen adaptation.

After The Jazz Singer was released in 1927, Warner Bros. gained huge success and were able to acquire their own string of movie theaters, after purchasing Stanley Theaters and First National Productions in 1928. In contrast Loews theaters owned MGM since forming in 1924, while the Fox Film Corporation owned the Fox Theatre. RKO (a 1928 merger between Keith-Orpheum Theaters and the Radio Corporation of America) also responded to the Western Electric/ERPI monopoly over sound in films, and developed their own method, known as Photophone, to put sound in films.

Paramount, which acquired Balaban and Katz in 1926, would answer to the success of Warner Bros. and RKO, and buy a number of theaters in the late 1920s as well, and would hold a monopoly on theaters in Detroit, Michigan. By the 1930s, almost all of the first-run metropolitan theaters in the United States were owned by the Big Five studios—MGM, Paramount Pictures, RKO, Warner Bros., and 20th Century Fox.

1927–1948: Rise and decline of the studio system

Motion picture companies operated under the studio system. The major studios kept thousands of people on salary—actors, producers, directors, writers, stunt men, crafts persons, and technicians. They owned or leased Movie Ranches in rural Southern California for location shooting of westerns and other large-scale genre films, and the major studios owned hundreds of theaters in cities and towns across the nation in 1920 film theaters that showed their films and that were always in need of fresh material.

In 1930, MPPDA President Will Hays created the Hays (Production) Code, which followed censorship guidelines and went into effect after government threats of censorship expanded by 1930. However, the code was never enforced until 1934, after the Catholic watchdog organization The Legion of Decency—appalled by some of the provocative films and lurid advertising of the era later classified Pre-Code Hollywood- threatened a boycott of motion pictures if it did not go into effect. The films that did not obtain a seal of approval from the Production Code Administration had to pay a $25,000 fine and could not profit in the theaters, as the MPPDA controlled every theater in the country through the Big Five studios.

Throughout the 1930s, as well as most of the golden age, MGM dominated the film screen and had the top stars in Hollywood, and they were also credited for creating the Hollywood star system altogether. Some MGM stars included "King of Hollywood" Clark Gable, Lionel Barrymore, Jean Harlow, Norma Shearer, Greta Garbo, Joan Crawford, Jeanette MacDonald, Gene Raymond, Spencer Tracy, Judy Garland, and Gene Kelly. But MGM did not stand alone.

Another great achievement of US cinema during this era came through Walt Disney's animation company. In 1937, Disney created the most successful film of its time, Snow White and the Seven Dwarfs. This distinction was promptly topped in 1939 when Selznick International created what is still, when adjusted for inflation, the most successful film of all time in Gone with the Wind.

Many film historians have remarked upon the many great works of cinema that emerged from this period of highly regimented filmmaking. One reason this was possible is that, with so many movies being made, not every one had to be a big hit. A studio could gamble on a medium-budget feature with a good script and relatively unknown actors: Citizen Kane, directed by Orson Welles (1915–1985) and often regarded as the greatest film of all time, fits this description. In other cases, strong-willed directors like Howard Hawks (1896–1977), Alfred Hitchcock (1899–1980), and Frank Capra (1897–1991) battled the studios in order to achieve their artistic visions.

The apogee of the studio system may have been the year 1939, which saw the release of such classics as The Wizard of Oz, Gone with the Wind, Stagecoach, Mr. Smith Goes to Washington, Wuthering Heights, Only Angels Have Wings, Ninotchka and Midnight. Among the other films from the Golden Age period that are now considered to be classics: Casablanca, It's a Wonderful Life, It Happened One Night, the original King Kong, Mutiny on the Bounty, Top Hat, City Lights, Red River, The Lady from Shanghai, Rear Window, On the Waterfront, Rebel Without a Cause, Some Like It Hot, and The Manchurian Candidate.

The studio system and the Golden Age of Hollywood succumbed to two forces that developed in the late 1940s:
 a federal antitrust action that separated the production of films from their exhibition; and
 the advent of television.
In 1938, Walt Disney's Snow White and the Seven Dwarfs was released during a run of lackluster films from the major studios, and quickly became the highest grossing film released to that point. Embarrassingly for the studios, it was an independently produced animated film that did not feature any studio-employed stars. This stoked already widespread frustration at the practice of block-booking, in which studios would only sell an entire year's schedule of films at a time to theaters and use the lock-in to cover for releases of mediocre quality.

Assistant Attorney General Thurman Arnold—a noted "trust buster" of the Roosevelt administration—took this opportunity to initiate proceedings against the eight largest Hollywood studios in July 1938 for violations of the Sherman Antitrust Act. The federal suit resulted in five of the eight studios (the "Big Five": Warner Bros., MGM, Fox, RKO and Paramount) reaching a compromise with Arnold in October 1940 and signing a consent decree agreeing to, within three years:
 Eliminate the block-booking of short film subjects, in an arrangement known as "one shot", or "full force" block-booking.
 Eliminate the block-booking of any more than five features in their theaters.
 No longer engage in blind buying (or the buying of films by theater districts without seeing films beforehand) and instead have trade-showing, in which all 31 theater districts in the US would see films every two weeks before showing movies in theaters.
 Set up an administration board in each theater district to enforce these requirements.

The "Little Three" (Universal Studios, United Artists, and Columbia Pictures), who did not own any theaters, refused to participate in the consent decree. A number of independent film producers were also unhappy with the compromise and formed a union known as the Society of Independent Motion Picture Producers and sued Paramount for the monopoly they still had over the Detroit Theaters—as Paramount was also gaining dominance through actors like Bob Hope, Paulette Goddard, Veronica Lake, Betty Hutton, crooner Bing Crosby, Alan Ladd, and longtime actor for studio Gary Cooper too- by 1942. The Big Five studios did not meet the requirements of the Consent of Decree during WWII, without major consequence, but after the war ended they joined Paramount as defendants in the Hollywood antitrust case, as did the Little Three studios.

The Supreme Court eventually ruled that the major studios ownership of theaters and film distribution was a violation of the Sherman Antitrust Act. As a result, the studios began to release actors and technical staff from their contracts with the studios. This changed the paradigm of film making by the major Hollywood studios, as each could have an entirely different cast and creative team.

The decision resulted in the gradual loss of the characteristics which made Metro-Goldwyn-Mayer, Paramount Pictures, Universal Studios, Columbia Pictures, RKO Pictures, and 20th Century Fox films immediately identifiable. Certain movie people, such as Cecil B. DeMille, either remained contract artists until the end of their careers or used the same creative teams on their films so that a DeMille film still looked like one whether it was made in 1932 or 1956.

Also, the number of movies being produced annually dropped as the average budget soared, marking a major change in strategy for the industry. Studios now aimed to produce entertainment that could not be offered by television: spectacular, larger-than-life productions. Studios also began to sell portions of their theatrical film libraries to other companies to sell to television. By 1949, all major film studios had given up ownership of their theaters.

This was complemented with the 1952 Miracle Decision in the Joseph Burstyn Inc. v. Wilson case, in which the Supreme Court of the United States reversed its earlier position, from 1915's Mutual Film Corporation v. Industrial Commission of Ohio case, and stated that motion pictures were a form of art and were entitled to the protection of the First amendment; US laws could no longer censor films. By 1968, with film studios becoming increasingly defiant to its censorship function, the Motion Picture Association of America (MPAA) had replaced the Hays Code–which was now greatly violated after the government threat of censorship that justified the origin of the code had ended—with the film rating system.

1965–1983: New Hollywood and post-classical cinema

Post-classical cinema is the changing methods of storytelling in the New Hollywood. It has been argued that new approaches to drama and characterization played upon audience expectations acquired in the classical period: chronology may be scrambled, storylines may feature "twist endings", and lines between the antagonist and protagonist may be blurred. The roots of post-classical storytelling may be seen in film noir, in Rebel Without a Cause (1955), and in Hitchcock's storyline-shattering Psycho.

The New Hollywood is the emergence of a new generation of film school-trained directors who had absorbed the techniques developed in Europe in the 1960s as a result of the French New Wave after the American Revolution; the 1967 film Bonnie and Clyde marked the beginning of American cinema rebounding as well, as a new generation of films would afterwards gain success at the box offices as well. Filmmakers like Francis Ford Coppola, Steven Spielberg, George Lucas, Brian De Palma, Stanley Kubrick, Martin Scorsese, Roman Polanski, and William Friedkin came to produce fare that paid homage to the history of film and developed upon existing genres and techniques. Inaugurated by the 1969 release of Andy Warhol Blue Movie, the phenomenon of adult erotic films being publicly discussed by celebrities (like Johnny Carson and Bob Hope), and taken seriously by critics (like Roger Ebert), a development referred to, by Ralph Blumenthal of The New York Times, as "porno chic", and later known as the Golden Age of Porn, began, for the first time, in modern American culture. According to award-winning author Toni Bentley, Radley Metzger 1976 film The Opening of Misty Beethoven, based on the play Pygmalion by George Bernard Shaw (and its derivative, My Fair Lady), and due to attaining a mainstream level in storyline and sets, is considered the "crown jewel" of this 'Golden Age'.

At the height of his fame in the early 1970s, Charles Bronson was the world's No. 1 box office attraction, commanding $1 million per film. In the 1970s, the films of New Hollywood filmmakers were often both critically acclaimed and commercially successful. While the early New Hollywood films like Bonnie and Clyde and Easy Rider had been relatively low-budget affairs with amoral heroes and increased sexuality and violence, the enormous success enjoyed by Friedkin with The Exorcist, Spielberg with Jaws, Coppola with The Godfather and Apocalypse Now, Scorsese with Taxi Driver, Kubrick with 2001: A Space Odyssey, Polanski with Chinatown, and Lucas with American Graffiti and Star Wars, respectively helped to give rise to the modern "blockbuster", and induced studios to focus ever more heavily on trying to produce enormous hits.

The increasing indulgence of these young directors did not help. Often, they would go overschedule, and overbudget, thus bankrupting themselves or the studio. The three most notable examples of this are Coppola's Apocalypse Now and One From The Heart and particularly Michael Cimino's Heaven's Gate, which single-handedly bankrupted United Artists. However, Apocalypse Now eventually made its money back and gained widespread recognition as a masterpiece, winning the Palme d'Or at Cannes.

1975–2008: Rise of the modern blockbuster and independent films

Spectacular epics which took advantage of new widescreen processes had been increasingly popular from the 1950s onwards.
The 1980s and 1990s saw another significant development. The full acceptance of home video by studios opened a vast new business to exploit. Films which may have performed poorly in their theatrical run were now able to find success in the video market. It also saw the first generation of filmmakers with access to videotapes emerge. Directors such as Quentin Tarantino and Paul Thomas Anderson had been able to view thousands of films and produced films with vast numbers of references and connections to previous works. Tarantino has had a number of collaborations with director Robert Rodriguez. Rodriguez directed the 1992 action film El Mariachi, which was a commercial success after grossing $2 million against a budget of $7,000.

This, along with the explosion of independent film and ever-decreasing costs for filmmaking, changed the landscape of American movie-making once again and led a renaissance of filmmaking among Hollywood's lower and middle-classes—those without access to studio financial resources. With the rise of the DVD in the 21st century, DVDs have quickly become even more profitable to studios and have led to an explosion of packaging extra scenes, extended versions, and commentary tracks with the films.

In the US, the PG-13 rating was introduced in 1984 to accommodate films that straddled the line between PG and R, which was mainly due to the controversies surrounding the violent content of the PG films Indiana Jones and the Temple of Doom and Gremlins (both 1984).

1988's Die Hard established what would become a common formula for many 1990s action films, featuring a lone everyman against a colorful terrorist character, who's usually holding hostages, in an isolated setting. Such films and their sequels are often referred to as "Die Hard on a _": Under Siege (battleship), Cliffhanger (mountain), Speed (bus), The Rock (prison island), Con Air (prison plane), Air Force One (presidential plane), etc.

Filmmakers in the 1990 had access to technological, political and economic innovations that had not been available in previous decades. Dick Tracy (1990) became the first 35 mm feature film with a digital soundtrack. Batman Returns (1992) was the first film to make use of the Dolby Digital six-channel stereo sound that has since become the industry standard. Computer-generated imagery was greatly facilitated when it became possible to transfer film images into a computer and manipulate them digitally. The possibilities became apparent in director James Cameron's Terminator 2: Judgment Day (1991), in images of the shape-changing character T-1000. Computer graphics or CG advanced to a point where Jurassic Park (1993) was able to use the techniques to create realistic looking animals. Jackpot (2001) became the first film that was shot entirely in digital. In the film Titanic, Cameron wanted to push the boundary of special effects with his film, and enlisted Digital Domain and Pacific Data Images to continue the developments in digital technology which the director pioneered while working on The Abyss and Terminator 2: Judgment Day. Many previous films about the RMS Titanic shot water in slow motion, which did not look wholly convincing. Cameron encouraged his crew to shoot their  miniature of the ship as if "we're making a commercial for the White Star Line".

Even The Blair Witch Project (1999), a low-budget indie horror film by Eduardo Sanchez and Daniel Myrick, was a huge financial success. Filmed on a budget of just $35,000, without any big stars or special effects, the film grossed $248 million with the use of modern marketing techniques and online promotion. Though not on the scale of George Lucas's $1 billion prequel to the Star Wars Trilogy, The Blair Witch Project earned the distinction of being the most profitable film of all time, in terms of percentage gross.

The success of Blair Witch as an indie project remains among the few exceptions, however, and control of The Big Five studios over filmmaking continued to increase through the 1990s. The Big Six companies all enjoyed a period of expansion in the 1990s. They each developed different ways to adjust to rising costs in the film industry, especially the rising salaries of movie stars, driven by powerful agents. The biggest stars like Sylvester Stallone, Russell Crowe, Tom Cruise, Nicole Kidman, Sandra Bullock, Arnold Schwarzenegger, Mel Gibson and Julia Roberts received between $15-$20 million per film and in some cases were even given a share of the film's profits.

Screenwriters on the other hand were generally paid less than the top actors or directors, usually under $1 million per film. However, the single largest factor driving rising costs was special effects. By 1999 the average cost of a blockbuster film was $60 million before marketing and promotion, which cost another $80 million. Since then, American films have become increasingly divided into two categories: Blockbusters and independent films.

Studios supplement these movies with independent productions, made with small budgets and often independently of the studio corporation. Movies made in this manner typically emphasize high professional quality in terms of acting, directing, screenwriting, and other elements associated with production, and also upon creativity and innovation. These movies usually rely upon critical praise or niche marketing to garner an audience. Because of an independent film's low budget, a successful independent film can have a high profit-to-cost ratio while a failure will incur minimal losses, allowing for studios to sponsor dozens of such productions in addition to their high-stakes releases.

American independent cinema was revitalized in the late 1980s and early 1990s when another new generation of moviemakers, including Spike Lee, Steven Soderbergh, Kevin Smith and Quentin Tarantino made movies like, respectively: Do the Right Thing, Sex, Lies, and Videotape, Clerks and Reservoir Dogs. In terms of directing, screenwriting, editing, and other elements, these movies were innovative and often irreverent, playing with and contradicting the conventions of Hollywood movies. Furthermore, their considerable financial successes and crossover into popular culture reestablished the commercial viability of independent film. Since then, the independent film industry has become more clearly defined and more influential in American cinema. Many of the major studios have capitalised on this by developing subsidiaries to produce similar films; for example, Fox Searchlight Pictures.

By this time, Harvey Weinstein was a Hollywood power player, commissioning critically acclaimed film such as Shakespeare in Love, Good Will Hunting, and the Academy Award-winning The English Patient. Under TWC Weinstein had released almost an unbroken chain of successful films. Best Picture winners The Artist and The King's Speech were released under Weinstein's commission.

The decade of the 2000s involved many significant developments in the film industries around the world, especially in the technology used. Building on developments in the 1990s, computers were used to create effects that would have previously been more expensive, from the subtle erasing of surrounding islands in Cast Away (leaving Tom Hanks' character stranded with no other land in sight) to the vast battle scenes such as those in The Matrix sequels and 300.

The 2000s saw the resurgence of several genres. Fantasy film franchises dominated the box office with The Lord of the Rings, Harry Potter, Pirates of the Caribbean, the Star Wars prequel trilogy (beginning in 1999), The Chronicles of Narnia, etc. Comic book superhero films became a mainstream blockbuster genre following the releases of Blade, X-Men, Unbreakable, and Spider-Man. Gladiator similarly sparked the revival of epic films, while the Bollywood-inspired Moulin Rouge! did the same for musical films. Computer animation replaced traditional animation as the dominant medium for animated feature films in American cinema. Although Hollywood still produces some films for the family audience, particularly animations, the vast majority of films are principally designed for young adult audiences.

2008–present: Contemporary cinema

Since the late 2000s, the theatrical market place has been dominated by the superhero genre, particularly since the emergence of the Marvel Cinematic Universe (2008–present) and the DC Extended Universe (2013–present).  they are the best-paying productions for actors, because paychecks in other genres have shrunk for even top actors.

As of 2020, the 2019 fantasy film Frozen II was originally planned to be released on Disney+ on June 26, 2020, before it was moved up to March 15. Disney CEO Bob Chapek explained that this was because of the film's "powerful themes of perseverance and the importance of family, messages that are incredibly relevant". On March 16, 2020, Universal announced that The Invisible Man, The Hunt, and Emma—all films in theaters at the time—would be available through Premium video on demand as early as March 20 at a suggested price of  each. After suffering poor box office since its release at the start of March, Onward was made available to purchase digitally on March 21, and was added to Disney+ on April 3. Paramount announced on March 20, Sonic the Hedgehog is also planning to have an early release to video on demand, on March 31. On March 16, Warner Bros. announced that Birds of Prey would be released early to video on demand on March 24. On April 3, Disney announced that Artemis Fowl, a film adaptation of the 2001 book of the same name, would move straight to Disney+ on June 12, skipping a theatrical release entirely.

In 2021 despite COVID-19 pandemic in the United States, studios that have produced various films such as Black Widow, F9, Death on the Nile and West Side Story were forced to postponed or delayed their releases to after 2020.

Various studios have responded to the crisis with controversial decisions to forgo the theatrical window and give their films day-and-date releases. NBCUniversal released Trolls World Tour directly to video-on-demand rental on April 10, while simultaneously receiving limited domestic theatrical screenings via drive-in cinemas; CEO Jeff Shell claims that the film had reached nearly $100 million in revenue within the first three weeks. The decision was opposed by AMC Theatres, which then announced that its screenings of Universal Pictures films would cease immediately, though the two companies would eventually agree to a 2-week theatrical window. By December 2020, Warner Bros. Pictures announced their decision to simultaneously release its slate of 2021 films in both theaters and its streaming site HBO Max for a period of one month in order to maximize viewership. The move was vehemently criticized by various industry figures, many of whom were reportedly uninformed of the decision before the announcement and felt deceived by the studio.

Industry commentators have noted the increasing treatment of films as "content" by corporations that correlate with the rise of streaming platforms such as Netflix, Disney+, Paramount+, and Apple TV+. This involves the blurring of boundaries between films, television and other forms of media as more people consume them together in a variety of ways, with individual films defined more by their brand identity and commercial potential rather than their medium, stories and artistry. Critic Matt Zoller Seitz has described the release of Avengers: Endgame in 2019 as "represent[ing] the decisive defeat of 'cinema' by 'content'" due to its grand success as a "piece of entertainment" defined by the Marvel brand that culminates a series of blockbuster films that has traits of serial television. The films Space Jam: A New Legacy and Red Notice have been cited as examples of this treatment, with the former being described by many critics as "a lengthy infomercial for HBO Max", featuring scenes and characters recalling various Warner Bros. properties such as Casablanca, The Matrix and Austin Powers, while the latter is a $200 million heist film from Netflix that critics described "a movie that feels more processed by a machine [...] instead of anything approaching artistic intent or even an honest desire to entertain." Some have expressed that Space Jam demonstrates the industry's increasingly cynical treatment of films as mere intellectual property (IP) to be exploited, an approach which critic Scott Mendelson called "IP for the sake of IP."

Hollywood and politics

In the 1930s, the Democrats and the Republicans saw money in Hollywood. President Franklin Roosevelt saw a huge partnership with Hollywood. He used the first real potential of Hollywood's stars in a national campaign. Melvyn Douglas toured Washington in 1939 and met the key New Dealers.

Political endorsements

Endorsements letters from leading actors were signed, radio appearances and printed advertising were made. Movie stars were used to draw a large audience into the political view of the party. By the 1960s, John F. Kennedy was a new, young face for Washington, and his strong friendship with Frank Sinatra exemplified this new era of glamour. The last moguls of Hollywood were gone and younger, newer executives and producers began pushing more liberal ideas.

Celebrities and money attracted politicians into the high-class, glittering Hollywood lifestyle. As Ron Brownstein wrote in his book The Power and the Glitter, television in the 1970s and 1980s was an enormously important new media in politics and Hollywood helped in that media with actors making speeches on their political beliefs, like Jane Fonda against the Vietnam War. Despite most celebrities and producers being left-leaning and tending to support the Democratic Party, this era produced some Republican actors and producers. Former actor Ronald Reagan became governor of California and subsequently became the 40th president of the United States. It continued with Arnold Schwarzenegger as California's governor in 2003.

Political donations

Today, donations from Hollywood help to fund federal politics. On February 20, 2007, for example, Democratic then-presidential candidate Barack Obama had a $2,300-a-plate Hollywood gala, being hosted by DreamWorks founders David Geffen, Jeffrey Katzenberg, and Steven Spielberg at the Beverly Hilton.

Criticisms

Covert advertising 
Native advertising is information designed to persuade in more subtle ways than classic propaganda. A modern example common in the United States is copaganda, in which TV shows display unrealistically flattering portrayals of law enforcement, in part to borrow equipment and get their assistance in blocking off streets to more easily film on location. Other reputation laundering accusations have been leveled in the entertainment industry, including the burnishing the image of the Mafia.

Product placement also has been a point of criticism, with the tobacco industry promoting smoking on screen. The Centers for Disease Control cites that 18% of teen smokers wouldn't start smoking if films with smoking were automatically given an 'R' rating, which would save 1 million lives.

Censorship

Hollywood producers generally seek to comply with the Chinese government's censorship requirements in a bid to access the country's restricted and lucrative cinema market, with the second-largest box office in the world as of 2016. This includes prioritizing sympathetic portrayals of Chinese characters in movies, such as changing the villains in Red Dawn from Chinese to North Koreans. Due to many topics forbidden in China, such as Dalai Lama and Winnie-the-Pooh being involved in the South Park's episode "Band in China", South Park was entirely banned in China after the episode's broadcast. The 2018 film Christopher Robin, the new Winnie-the-Pooh movie, was denied a Chinese release.

Although Tibet was previously a cause célèbre in Hollywood, featuring in films including Kundun and Seven Years in Tibet, in the 21st century this is no longer the case. In 2016, Marvel Entertainment attracted criticism for its decision to cast Tilda Swinton as "The Ancient One" in the film adaptation Doctor Strange, using a white woman to play a traditionally Tibetan character. Actor and high-profile Tibet supporter Richard Gere stated that he was no longer welcome to participate in mainstream Hollywood films after criticizing the Chinese government and calling for a boycott of the 2008 Summer Olympics in Beijing.

Historic examples 
Hollywood also self-censored any negative depictions of Nazis for most of the 1930's in order to maintain access to German audiences. Around that time economic censorship resulted in the self-censoring of content to please the group wielding their economic influence. The Hays Code was an industry-led effort from 1930-1967 to strict self-censorship in order to appease religious objections to certain content and stave off any government censorship that could have resulted.

Global Hollywood

Political economy of communication researchers have long focused on the international or global presence, power, profitability and popularity of Hollywood films. Books on global Hollywood by Toby Miller and Richard Maxwell, Janet Wasko and Mary Erickson, Kerry Segrave, John Trumpbour and Tanner Mirrlees examine the international political economy of Hollywood's power.

According to Tanner Mirrlees, Hollywood relies on four capitalist strategies "to attract and integrate non-US film producers, exhibitors and audiences into its ambit: ownership, cross-border productions with subordinate service providers, content licensing deals with exhibitors, and blockbusters designed to travel the globe."

In 1912, American film companies were largely immersed in the competition for the domestic market. It was difficult to satisfy the huge demand for films created by the nickelodeon boom. Motion Picture Patents Company members such as Edison Studios, also sought to limit competition from French, Italian, and other imported films. Exporting films, then, became lucrative to these companies. Vitagraph Studios was the first American company to open its own distribution offices in Europe, establishing a branch in London in 1906, and a second branch in Paris shortly after.

Other American companies were moving into foreign markets as well, and American distribution abroad continued to expand until the mid-1920s. Originally, a majority of companies sold their films indirectly. However, since they were inexperienced in overseas trading, they simply sold the foreign rights to their films to foreign distribution firms or export agents. Gradually, London became a center for the international circulation of US films.

Many British companies made a profit by acting as the agents for this business, and by doing so, they weakened British production by turning over a large share of the UK market to American films. By 1911, approximately 60 to 70 percent of films imported into Great Britain were American. The United States was also doing well in Germany, Australia, and New Zealand.

More recently, as globalization has started to intensify, and the United States government has been actively promoting free trade agendas and trade on cultural products, Hollywood has become a worldwide cultural source. The success on Hollywood export markets can be known not only from the boom of American multinational media corporations across the globe but also from the unique ability to make big-budget films that appeal powerfully to popular tastes in many different cultures.

With globalization, movie production has been clustered in Hollywood for several reasons: the United States has the largest single home market in dollar terms, entertaining and highly visible Hollywood movies have global appeal, and the role of English as a universal language contributes to compensating for higher fixed costs of production.

Hollywood has moved more deeply into Chinese markets, although influenced by China's censorship. Films made in China are censored, strictly avoiding themes like "ghosts, violence, murder, horror, and demons." Such plot elements risk being cut. Hollywood has had to make "approved" films, corresponding to official Chinese standards, but with aesthetic standards sacrificed to box office profits. Even Chinese audiences found it boring to wait for the release of great American movies dubbed in their native language.

Role of women

Women's representation in film has been considered an issue almost as long as film has been an industry. Women's portrayals have been criticized as dependent on other characters, motherly and domestic figures who stay at home, overemotional, and confined to low-status jobs when compared to enterprising and ambitious male characters. With this, women are underrepresented and continually cast and stuck in gender stereotypes.

Women are statistically underrepresented in creative positions in the center of the US film industry, Hollywood. This underrepresentation has been called the "celluloid ceiling", a variant on the employment discrimination term "glass ceiling". In 2013, the "top-paid actors ... made  times as much money as the top-paid actresses." "[O]lder [male] actors make more than their female equals" in age, with "female movie stars mak[ing] the most money on average per film at age 34 while male stars earn the most at 51."

The 2013 Celluloid Ceiling Report conducted by the Center for the Study of Women in Television and Film at San Diego State University collected a list of statistics gathered from "2,813 individuals employed by the 250 top domestic grossing films of 2012."

Women represented only 36 percent of major characters in film in 2018—a one percent decline from the 37 percent recorded in 2017. In 2019, that percentage increased to 40 percent. Women account for 51 percent of moviegoers. However, when it comes to key jobs like director and cinematographer, men continue to dominate. For the Academy Award nominations, only five women have ever been nominated for Best Director, but none have ever won in that category in the past 92 years. While female representation has improved, there is work yet to be done with regards to the diversity among those females. The percentage of black female characters went from 16 percent in 2017 to 21 percent in 2018. The representation of Latina actresses, however, decreased to four percent over the past year, three percentage points lower than the seven percent achieved in 2017.

Women accounted for:
 "18% of all directors, executive producers, producers, writers, cinematographers, and editors. This reflected no change from 2011 and only a 1% increase from 1998."
 "9% of all directors."
 "15% of writers."
 "25% of all producers."
 "20% of all editors."
 "2% of all cinematographers."
 "38% of films employed 0 or 1 woman in the roles considered, 23% employed 2 women, 28% employed 3 to 5 women, and 10% employed 6 to 9 women."

A New York Times article stated that only 15% of the top films in 2013 had women for a lead acting role. The author of the study noted that "The percentage of female speaking roles has not increased much since the 1940s when they hovered around 25 percent to 28 percent." "Since 1998, women's representation in behind-the-scenes roles other than directing has gone up just 1 percent." Women "directed the same percent of the 250 top-grossing films in 2012 (9 percent) as they did in 1998."

Race and ethnicity

On May 10, 2021, NBC announced that it would not televise the 79th Golden Globe Awards in 2022, in support of a boycott of the HFPA by multiple media companies over inadequate efforts to address lack of diversity representation within the membership of the association with person of color, but that it would be open to televise the ceremony in 2023 if the HFPA were successful in its efforts to reform.

Since the late days of the film industry, celluloid representations of Irish Americans have been plentiful. Films with Irish-American themes include social dramas such as Little Nellie Kelly and The Cardinal, labor epics like On the Waterfront, and gangster movies such as Angels with Dirty Faces, The Friends of Eddie Coyle, and The Departed. Though the classic era of American Cinema is dominated predominantly by Caucasian people in front of and behind the camera, minorities and people of color have managed to carve their own pathways to getting their films on the screen.

American cinema has often reflected and propagated negative stereotypes towards foreign nationals and ethnic minorities. For example, Russians and Russian Americans are usually portrayed as brutal mobsters, ruthless agents and villains. According to Russian American professor Nina L. Khrushcheva, "You can't even turn the TV on and go to the movies without reference to Russians as horrible." Italians and Italian Americans are usually associated with organized crime and the Mafia. Hispanic and Latino Americans are largely depicted as sexualized figures such as the Latino macho or the Latina vixen, gang members, (illegal) immigrants, or entertainers. However representation in Hollywood has enhanced in latter times of which it gained noticeable momentum in the 1990s and does not emphasize oppression, exploitation, or resistance as central themes. According to Ramírez Berg, third wave films "do not accentuate Chicano oppression or resistance; ethnicity in these films exists as one fact of several that shape characters' lives and stamps their personalities." Filmmakers like Edward James Olmos and Robert Rodriguez were able to represent the Hispanic and Latino Americans experience like none had on screen before, and actors like Hilary Swank, Jordana Brewster, Jessica Alba, Camilla Belle, Al Madrigal, Alexis Bledel, Alexa PenaVega, Ana de Armas and Rachel Zegler have become successful. In the last decade, minority filmmakers like Chris Weitz, Alfonso Gomez-Rejon and Patricia Riggen have been given applier narratives. Early portrayal in films of them include La Bamba (1987), Selena (1997), The Mask of Zorro (1998), Goal II (2007), Overboard (2018), Father of the Bride (2022) and Josefina López's Real Women Have Curves, originally a play which premiered in 1990 and was later released as a film in 2002.

African-American representation in Hollywood improved drastically towards the end of the 20th century after the fall of the studio system, as filmmakers like Spike Lee and John Singleton were able to represent the African American experience like none had on screen before, whilst actors like Halle Berry and Will Smith became massively successful box office draws. In the last few decades, minority filmmakers like Ryan Coogler, Ava DuVernay and F Gary Gray have been given the creative reigns to major tentpole productions. In old Hollywood, when racial prejudices were socially acceptable, it was not uncommon for white actors to wear black face. In Moonlight, masculinity is portrayed as rigid and aggressive, amongst the behavior of young black males in Chiron's teenage peer group. The expression of hyper-masculinity among black men has been associated with peer acceptance and community. Being a homosexual within the black community, on the other hand, has been associated with social alienation and homophobic judgement by peers because black gay men are seen as weak or effeminate. In the film, Chiron is placed in this divide as a black gay man and alters his presentation of masculinity as a strategy to avoid ridicule because homosexuality is viewed as incompatible with black masculine expectations. As young kids, Kevin hides his sexuality in order to avoid being singled out like Chiron is. As Chiron grows older, he recognizes the need to conform to a heteronormative ideal of black masculinity in order to avoid abuse and homophobia. As an adult, Chiron chooses to embrace the stereotypical black male gender performance by becoming muscular and a drug-dealer.

According to Korean-American actor Daniel Dae Kim, Asian and Asian American men "have been portrayed as inscrutable villains and asexualized kind of eunuchs." Seen as exceedingly polite and sumbissive. The Media Action Network for Asian Americans accused the director and studio of whitewashing the cast of the film Aloha, and Crowe apologized about Emma Stone being miscast as a character who is meant to be of one quarter Chinese and one quarter Hawaiian descent. Throughout the 20th century, acting roles film were relatively few, and many available roles were narrow characters. More recently, young Asian American comedians and film-makers have found an outlet on YouTube allowing them to gain a strong and loyal fanbase among their fellow Asian Americans. Although more recently the film Crazy Rich Asians film has been lauded in the United States for featuring a predominantly Asian cast, it was criticized elsewhere for casting biracial and non-Chinese actors as ethnically Chinese characters. Another film Always Be My Maybe who has been lauded recently takes familiar rom-com beats and cleverly layers in smart social commentary to find its own sweet groove." according to Rotten Tomatoes

Before 9/11, Arabs and Arab Americans were often portrayed as terrorists. The decision to hire Naomi Scott, in the Aladdin film, the daughter of an English father and a Gujarati Ugandan-Indian mother, to play the lead of Princess Jasmine, also drew criticism, as well as accusations of colorism, as some commentators expected the role to go to an actress of Arab or Middle Eastern origin. In January 2018, it was reported that white extras were being applied brown make-up during filming in order to "blend in", which caused an outcry and condemnation among fans and critics, branding the practice as "an insult to the whole industry" while accusing the producers of not recruiting people with Middle-Eastern or North African heritage. Disney responded to the controversy saying, "Diversity of our cast and background performers was a requirement and only in a handful of instances when it was a matter of specialty skills, safety and control (special effects rigs, stunt performers and handling of animals) were crew made up to blend in." The field of American comedy includes many Jews. The legacy also includes songwriters and authors, for example the author of the song "Viva Las Vegas" Doc Pomus, or Billy the Kid composer Aaron Copland. Many Jews have been at the forefront of women's issues.

In the 20th century, early portrayals of Native Americans in movies and television roles were first performed by European Americans dressed in mock traditional attire. Examples included The Last of the Mohicans (1920), Hawkeye and the Last of the Mohicans (1957), and F Troop (1965–67). In later decades, Native American actors such as Jay Silverheels in The Lone Ranger television series (1949–57) came to prominence. The roles of Native Americans were limited and not reflective of Native American culture. By the 1970s some Native American film roles began to show more complexity, such as those in Little Big Man (1970), Billy Jack (1971), and The Outlaw Josey Wales (1976), which depicted Native Americans in minor supporting roles.

Working conditions
Hollywood's work flow is unique in that much of its work force doesn't report to the same factory each day, nor follow the same routine from day to day, but films at distant locations around the world, with a schedule dictated by the scenes being filmed rather than what makes the most sense for productivity. For instance, an urban film shot entirely on location at night would require the bulk of its crews to work a graveyard shift, while a situational comedy series that shoots primarily on stage with only one or two days a week on location would follow a more traditional work schedule. Westerns are often shot in desert locations far from the homes of the crew in areas with limited hotels that necessitate long drives before and after a shooting day, which take advantage of as many hours of sunlight available, ultimately requiring workers to put in 16 or 17 hours a day from the time they leave their home to the time they return.

While the role of labor in America has waned in many parts of the country, the unions have maintained a firm grip in Hollywood since their start during Great Depression when workers would line up outside the thriving movie studios looking for the only job in town. Terrible conditions awaited those workers as the studios exploited the eager workforce with meager pay and the ever present threat of the hundreds of others waiting just outside the gates to take their place if they voiced any complaints.

Due to the casual nature of employment in Hollywood, it's only through collective bargaining can individual workers express their rights to minimum wage guarantees and access to pension & health plans that carry over from film to film or tv series to tv series, and offer the studios access to a trained workforce able to step onto a set on day one with the knowledge and experience to handle the highly technical equipment they are asked to operate.

The majority of the workers in Hollywood are represented by several unions and guilds. The 150,000 member strong International Alliance of Theatrical Stage Employees (IATSE) represents most of the crafts, such as the grips, electricians, and camera people, as well as editors, sound engineers, and hair & make-up artists. The Screen Actors Guild (SAG) is the next largest group representing some 130,000 actors and performers, the Directors Guild of America (DGA) represents the directors and production managers, the Writers Guild of America (WGA) representing writers, and the International Brotherhood of Teamsters (IBT) represents the drivers.

The unions and guilds serve as the collective bargaining unit for their membership, negotiating on regular intervals (most currently on 3 year contracts) with the Alliance of Motion Picture and Television Producers (AMPTP), a trade alliance representing the film studios and television networks that hire the crews to create their content.

While the relationship between labor and management has generally been amicable over the years, working together with the state to develop safe protocols to continue working during Covid-19 and lobbying together in favor of tax incentives, contract negotiations have been known to get contentious over changes in the industry and as a response to rising income inequality. The relationship even turned bloody in 1945 as a six month strike by set decorators turned into a bloody melee on a sweltering October day between strikers, scabs, strikebreakers, and studio security.

See also

 :Category:Documentary films about Hollywood, Los Angeles
 :Category:Documentary films about the cinema of the United States
 :Category:Films about Hollywood, Los Angeles
 Lists of American films
 American comedy films
 American Film Institute
 History of animation in the United States
 List of films in the public domain in the United States
 Motion Picture Association of America film rating system
 National Film Registry
General
 List of cinema of the world
 Photography in the United States of America
 Cinema of North America

References

Notes 
 
 Fraser, George McDonald (1988). The Hollywood History of the World, from One Million Years B.C. to 'Apocalypse Now. London: M. Joseph; "First US ed.", New York: Beech Tree Books. Both eds. collate thus: xix, 268 p., amply ill. (b&w photos).  (U.K. ed.), 0-688-07520-7 (US ed.).

Further reading
 Hallett, Hilary A. Go West, Young Women! The Rise of Early Hollywood. Berkeley, CA: University of California Press, 2013.
 Ragan, David. Who's Who in Hollywood, 1900–1976. New Rochelle, NY: Arlington House, 1976.i was thinking to

External links

 
Industry in the United States
Culture of Hollywood, Los Angeles
History of the United States by topic